Aeugst am Albis is a municipality in the district of Affoltern in the canton of Zürich in Switzerland.

History
Aeugst am Albis is first mentioned in 876/877 as Ousta.  In 1277 it was mentioned as Oeugsten.

Geography
 
Of this area, 52.7% is used for agricultural purposes, while 31.3% is forested. Of the rest of the land, 11.6% is settled (buildings or roads) and the remainder (4.5%) is non-productive (rivers, glaciers or mountains).

The municipality includes the village of Aeugst, which is located on a southern terrace of the Aeugsterberg.  It also includes Wengi and in the upper Reppischtal, the village of Aeugstertal.

Demographics
, 9.7% of the population was made up of foreign nationals. Over the last 10 years the population has grown at a rate of 17.8%. Most of the population speaks German  (95.2%), with English being second most common ( 1.6%) and French being third ( 0.9%).

After the 2010 elections, the SVP is no longer represented in the municipality council.

The age distribution of the population is children and teenagers (0–19 years old) make up 24.2% of the population, while adults (20–64 years old) make up 65.5% and seniors (over 64 years old) make up 10.3%.  In Aeugst am Albis about 83.5% of the population (between age 25-64) have completed either non-mandatory upper secondary education or additional higher education (either university or a Fachhochschule).

Aeugst am Albis has an unemployment rate of 1.55%.  , there were 67 people employed in the primary economic sector and about 25 businesses involved in this sector.  17 people are employed in the secondary sector and there are 9 businesses in this sector.  253 people are employed in the tertiary sector, with 55 businesses in this sector.
The historical population is given in the following table:

References

External links

 Official website 
 

Municipalities of the canton of Zürich